Judy Harrow (March 3, 1945 – March 20, 2014) was an author, counselor, lecturer, and Wiccan priestess.

Biography 
Judy Harrow, also known as Judith Harrow, was born in the Bronx  and lived the majority of her life in New York City.  She later lived in northern New Jersey.  Harrow died on 20 March 2014.

Education 
Harrow graduated from Bronx High School of Science in 1962.  She then received a B.A. in American government from Western College for Women in 1966.  In 1977 she participated in the La Jolla program in group facilitation.  In 1979 Judy Harrow graduated from City College of New York Graduate School of Education with a M.S. in counseling with honors.

Mainstream counseling work 
Judy Harrow was a member of the Association for Humanistic Psychology and of the American Counseling Association. Within ACA, she belonged to the following special interest subgroups: 
the Association for Spiritual, Ethical and Religious Values in Counseling (ASERVIC)
the Association for Specialists in Group Work (ASGW)
the International Association of Marriage and Family Counselors (IAMFC).

Harrow served as the President of New Jersey ASERVIC, and on the Book Review Board of the Family Journal, a publication of IAMFC.

Harrow served as a member of the National Advisory Board of the Consultation on Multifaith Education.  She was also a member of the steering committee of the Interfaith Council of Greater New York.  She managed the Council's email list and acted as their liaison with the United Religions Initiative.  She served as the Council's Program Coordinator in the year 1996-1997.

Neopaganism 
Harrow began studying Witchcraft in 1976, and was initiated as a Priestess in September 1977.  She founded the Inwood Study Group in June, 1980.  After Harrow received her third degree Gardnerian initiation in November, 1980, this group became Proteus Coven, which thereafter affiliated with Covenant of the Goddess in August, 1981.  She served as convening First Officer of Northeast Local Council of CoG in 1983, National First Officer of CoG in 1984, and Co-chair of CoG Grand Council in 1985. She has held various other positions on the CoG National and Local Boards of Directors, most recently National Public Information Officer from 1993-1995.  In January, 1985, Harrow became the first member of CoG to be legally registered as clergy in New York City, after a five-year effort requiring the assistance of the New York Civil Liberties Union.

Harrow was the Chair-emerita of the Pastoral Counseling Department at Cherry Hill Seminary. She founded the Pagan Pastoral Counseling Network in 1982, and served as the first editor of the Network's publication. She co-created a workshop series on Basic Counseling Skills for Coven Leaders, which has successfully run many times.  This grew into a series of intensive workshops for Pagan elders on a range of topics. Harrow also founded the New York Area Coven Leaders' Peer Support Group. She served as Program Coordinator for the first Mid-Atlantic Pan Pagan Conference and Festival and for seven other Pagan gatherings.

For two years, Harrow produced Reconnections, a weekly feature on the activities of religious progressives of all faiths, for WBAI radio in New York.

Harrow contributed two essays to Modern Rites of Passage (Book 2 in the "Witchcraft Today" anthology series), and one to the anthology Magical Religion and Modern Witchcraft, published in 1996 by SUNY Press.  One of these essays has since been reprinted in The Paganism Reader  (Routledge, 2004).  She has also written for AHP Perspective (the Newsletter of the Association for Humanistic Psychology), Counseling and Values (the Journal of the Association for Spiritual, Ethical and Religious Values in Counseling), Gnosis, and such small Pagan publications as Dayshift, Harvest, and the CoG Newsletter.  Harrow was a regular contributor to PanGaia, writing a column entitled "Mind and Magic."

Her first book, Wicca Covens, was published in 1999.  Her second book, Spiritual Mentoring, was published in 2002. Harrow also edited (and contributed to) Devoted to You: Honoring Deity in Wiccan Practice, which was published in 2003, and coordinated the 50th Anniversary reissue of Witchcraft Today by Gerald Gardner, published in 2004.

Works 
  1999 - Wicca Covens. Published 1999 Citadel Press 
  2002 - Spiritual Mentoring: A Pagan Guide Published 2002 ECW Press 
  2003 - Devoted to You: Honoring Deity in Wiccan Practice Citadel Press

Notes 

1945 births
American occultists
American Wiccans
People from the Bronx
20th-century American Jews
Wiccan priestesses
Miami University alumni
City College of New York alumni
2014 deaths
Wiccans of Jewish descent
21st-century American Jews